Pauper apprentices in England and Wales were the children of paupers who were bound out by the local parish overseers and churchwardens. Some had to travel long distances to serve in the factories of the Industrial Revolution, but the majority served their terms within a few miles of their homes.

External links
http://www.spartacus-educational.com/IRworkhouse.children.htm
http://www1.conyers.stockton.sch.uk/sparkingthegap/victorians/pauper.asp

Child labour
Children's rights in England
Children's rights in Wales
Poverty in the United Kingdom
Manufacturing in England
Industrial Revolution
Poverty in England